Palaiokastritsa ( meaning Little Old Castle place, referring to nearby Angelokastro) is a village in northwestern Corfu, Greece. Corfu has been suggested to be the mythical island of the Phaeacians and the bay of Palaiokastritsa to be the place where Odysseus disembarked and met Nausicaa for the first time. The monastery in Palaiokastritsa, which dates from 1225, houses a museum.

Administrative history
Palaiokastrites was a former municipality on the island of Corfu, Ionian Islands, Greece. Its including area was defined around the original village of Palaiokastritsa. Since the 2019 local government reform Palaiokastrites is part of the municipality of Central Corfu and Diapontia Islands as a smaller municipal unit. It has a land area of 48.379 km² and a population of 4,068 (2011 census) and is located on the west coast of Corfu just south of Angelokastro. The seat of the formerly independent Palaiokastriton municipality was the town of Lakones (pop. 384). The largest villages are Liapades (pop. 879), Doukades (627), Skriperó (500), and Lákones.

Subdivisions
The municipal unit Palaiokastriton is subdivided into the following communities (constituent villages in brackets):
Lakones (Lakones, Palaiokastritsa)
Aleimmatades (Aleimmatades, Agia Anna)
Gardelades
Doukades (Doukades, Papathanatika)
Krini
Liapades (Liapades, Gefyra)
Makrades (Makrades, Vistonas)
Skripero (Skripero, Felekas)

Gallery

External links
Video on Palaiokastritsa from ERT's travelling program Traveling in Greece (Menoume Ellada) 
Palaiokastritsa Travel Guide (Corfu) 
The weather in Corfu and Paleokastritsa

References

Populated places in Corfu (regional unit)
Beaches of Greece
Seaside resorts in Greece
Tourist attractions in the Ionian Islands (region)